America Dances was a radio program that presented various orchestras on the NBC Red Network on Saturday evenings beginning in 1935. It was promoted with the line, "Swing from coast to coast."

Orchestras and musicians featured included the Frank Hodek Orchestra, Fats Waller and Gene Krupa. 

1930s American radio programs
American music radio programs
NBC radio programs